New Windsor Historic District is a national historic district at New Windsor, Carroll County, Maryland, United States.  The district contains a wide variety of domestic, commercial, public, educational, and religious resources reflecting the development of the town from its founding in 1796 up to the World War II era.  Most common homes are 2- or -story center-entrance or center-passage plan dwellings, of both three and five bays, and three-bay side-passage plan houses.

It was added to the National Register of Historic Places in 1997.

References

External links
, including photo from 2006, at Maryland Historical Trust
Boundary Map of the New Windsor Historic District, Carroll County, at Maryland Historical Trust

Historic districts in Carroll County, Maryland
Historic districts on the National Register of Historic Places in Maryland
Queen Anne architecture in Maryland
Colonial Revival architecture in Maryland
New Windsor, Maryland
National Register of Historic Places in Carroll County, Maryland